Morgoth was a German death metal band that was formed in 1985 by Rüdiger Hennecke and Carsten Otterbach in Meschede.

History
Originally the band used the name Cadaverous Smell and they played grindcore / noise style music. When Harry Busse joined the band they renamed themselves to "Minas Morgul". In 1985 the band settled on Morgoth when singer and bass-player Marc Grewe joined the band. The name was derived from the epithet of the original dark lord Melkor in J.R.R Tolkien's Middle-earth Legendarium. They recorded the Pits of Utumno demo on four tracks in 1988, which eventually led to the band being signed with Century Media, which had just started.

In 1989, Morgoth recorded their second demo Resurrection Absurd in a twenty-four-track studio, which was released by Century Media in the same year as an EP. The band then toured Germany in support of Pestilence and Autopsy. The Eternal Fall was recorded shortly after the tour finished, which was quickly followed by a second tour with Demolition Hammer and Obituary. Grewe stopped playing bass and Sebastian Swart joined as the bass player.

In February 1991, the first actual full-length album was recorded in the Woodhouse studios, titled Cursed. To promote the album the band supported Kreator and Biohazard on a US tour and another European tour with Immolation and Massacre. Most of the band then relocated to Dortmund. Morgoth took a break then and only to return in 1993 with the album Odium. More touring followed, with Tankard, Unleashed and Tiamat. Nevertheless, most of the band members started to lose interest in an active music career and ventured in other directions.

Eventually a third album was recorded, Feel Sorry for the Fanatic, on which they incorporated more and more industrial influences. A tour followed the release of the album, with Die Krupps and Richthofen. The band broke up in 1998.
In 2010 reformed to participate in the Death Feast Open Air and confirmed that a 2011 "Cursed" reunion tour will be played. They later performed at the 2011 
Wacken Open Air.

As of December 5, 2014 Morgoth parted ways with their longtime lead vocalist Marc Grewe but will continue as a band with a new lead vocalist. The band also released a new album in the spring of 2015, titled Ungod.

On May 24, 2018, the band announced they would be going on hiatus following their performance on June 8 at the Chronical Moshers Open Air in Germany. On December 17, 2020, Morgoth announced that they had broken up again.

Band members

Current members
Harald Busse – guitars 
Sebastian Swart – guitars , bass 
Sotirios Kelekidis – bass 
Marc "Speedy" Reign – drums 
Karsten "Jagger" Jäger – vocals

Former members
Carsten Otterbach – guitars 
Rüdiger Hennecke – drums 
Marc Grewe – vocals , bass 

Timeline

Discography
Pits of Utumno (Demo, 1988)
Resurrection Absurd (EP, 1989)
The Eternal Fall (EP, 1990)
Cursed (1991)
Odium (1993)
Feel Sorry for the Fanatic (1996)
1987-1997: The Best of Morgoth (Best of/Compilation, 2005)
Cursed To Live (DVD, 2012)
God is evil (Single, 2014)
Ungod (2015)

References

External links
 
 Extensive interview with Morgoth
 Interview for the 20th anniversary of Cursed
 Encyclopaedia Metallum

German death metal musical groups
Musical groups established in 1987
Musical groups disestablished in 1998
Musical quintets
Things named after Tolkien works